The brown trout (Salmo trutta) is a European species of salmonid fish that has been widely introduced into suitable environments globally. It includes purely freshwater populations, referred to as the riverine ecotype, Salmo trutta morpha fario, a lacustrine ecotype, S. trutta morpha lacustris, also called the lake trout, and anadromous forms known as the sea trout, S. trutta morpha trutta. The latter migrates to the oceans for much of its life and returns to fresh water only to spawn. Sea trout in Ireland and Britain have many regional names: sewin in Wales, finnock in Scotland, peal in the West Country, mort in North West England, and white trout in Ireland.

The lacustrine morph of brown trout is most usually potamodromous, migrating from lakes into rivers or streams to spawn.S. trutta morpha fario forms stream-resident populations, typically in alpine streams, but sometimes in larger rivers. Anadromous and non-anadromous morphs coexisting in the same river appear genetically  identical. What determines whether or not they migrate remains unknown.

Taxonomy 
The scientific name of the brown trout is Salmo trutta. The specific epithet trutta derives from the Latin trutta, meaning, literally, "trout". Behnke (2007) relates that the brown trout was the first species of trout described in the 1758 edition of Systema Naturae by Swedish zoologist Carl Linnaeus. Systema Naturae established the system of binomial nomenclature for animals. Salmo trutta was used to describe anadromous or sea-run forms of brown trout. Linnaeus also described two other brown trout species in 1758. Salmo fario was used for riverine forms. Salmo lacustris was used for lake-dwelling forms.

Range 

The native range of brown trout extends from northern Norway and White Sea tributaries in Russia in the Arctic Ocean to the Atlas Mountains in North Africa. The western limit of their native range is Iceland in the north Atlantic, while the eastern limit is in Aral Sea tributaries in Afghanistan and Pakistan.

Introduction outside their natural range
Brown trout have been widely introduced into suitable environments around the world, including North and South America, Australasia, Asia, and South and East Africa. Introduced brown trout have established self-sustaining, wild populations in many introduced countries. The first introductions were in Australia in 1864 when 300 of 1500 brown trout eggs from the River Itchen survived a four-month voyage from Falmouth, Cornwall to Melbourne on the sailing ship Norfolk. By 1866, 171 young brown trout were surviving in a Plenty River hatchery in Tasmania. Thirty-eight young trout were released in the river, a tributary of the River Derwent in 1866. By 1868, the Plenty River hosted a self-sustaining population of brown trout which became a brood source for continued introduction of brown trout into Australian and New Zealand rivers. Successful introductions into the Natal and Cape Provinces of South Africa took place in 1890 and 1892, respectively. By 1909, brown trout were established in the mountains of Kenya. The first introductions into the Himalayas in northern India took place in 1868, and by 1900, brown trout were established in Kashmir and Madras. In the 1950s and 1960s, a French geologist, began the introduction of several species of salmonids on the remote Kerguelen Islands in the southern Indian Ocean. Of the seven species introduced, only brook trout, Salvelinus fontinalis, and brown trout survived to establish wild populations.

Introduction to Americas 
The first introductions in Canada occurred in 1883 in Newfoundland and continued until 1933. The only Canadian regions without brown trout are Yukon and the Northwest Territories. Introductions into South America began in 1904 in Argentina. Brown trout are now established in Chile, Peru and the Falklands. Sea-run forms of brown trout exceeding  are caught by local anglers on a regular basis.

The von Behr brown trout came from both mountain streams and large lakes in the Black Forest region of Baden-Württemberg. The original shipment of "von Behr" brown trout eggs were handled by three hatcheries, one on Long Island, the Cold Spring Hatchery operated by Mather, one in Caledonia, New York, operated by pisciculturalist Seth Green, and other hatchery in Northville, Michigan. Additional shipments of "von Behr" brown trout eggs arrived in 1884. In 1885, brown trout eggs from Loch Leven, Scotland, arrived in New York. These "Loch Leven" brown trout were distributed to the same hatcheries. Over the next few years, additional eggs from Scotland, England, and Germany were shipped to U.S. hatcheries. Behnke (2007) believed all life forms of brown trout—anadromous, riverine, and lacustrine—were imported into the U.S. and intermingled genetically to create what he calls the American generic brown trout and a single subspecies the North European brown trout (S. t. trutta).

In April 1884, the U.S. Fish Commission released 4900 brown trout fry into the Baldwin River, a tributary of the Pere Marquette River in Michigan. This was the first release of brown trout into U.S. waters. Between 1884 and 1890, brown trout were introduced into suitable habitats throughout the U.S. By 1900, 38 states and two territories had received stocks of brown trout. Their adaptability resulted in most of these introductions establishing wild, self-sustaining populations.

Conservation status 

The fish is not considered to be endangered, although some individual stocks are under various degrees of stress mainly through habitat degradation, overfishing, and artificial propagation leading to introgression. Increased frequency of excessively warm water temperatures in high summer causes a reduction in dissolved oxygen levels which can cause "summer kills" of local populations if temperatures remain high for sufficient duration and deeper/cooler or fast, turbulent more oxygenated water is not accessible to the fish. This phenomenon can be further exacerbated by eutrophication of rivers due to pollution—often from the use of agricultural fertilizers within the drainage basin.

Overfishing is a problem where anglers fail to identify and return mature female fish into the lake or stream. Each large female removed can result in thousands fewer eggs released back into the system when the remaining fish spawn.

Another threat is other introduced organisms. For example, in Canada's Bow River, a non-native alga Didymosphenia geminata—common name rock snot (due to appearance)—has resulted in reduced circulation of water amongst the substrate of the river bed in affected areas. This, in turn, can greatly reduce the number of trout eggs that survive to hatch. Over time, this leads to reduction of the population of adult fish in the areas affected by the algae, forming a circle of decline. Rock snot is believed to have spread accidentally on the soles of the footwear of visitors from areas where the alga is native. The wide variety of issues that adversely affect brown trout throughout its range do not exclusively affect brown trout, but affect many or all species within a water body, thus altering the ecosystem in which the trout reside.

In small streams, brown trout are important predators of macroinvertebrates, and declining brown trout populations in these specific areas affect the entire aquatic food web.

Global climate change is also of concern. S. trutta bones from an archaeological site in Italy, and ancient DNA extracted from some of these bones, indicate that both abundance and genetic diversity increased markedly during the colder Younger Dryas period, and fell during the warmer Bølling-Allerød event.

Cover or structure is important to trout, and they are more likely to be found near submerged rocks and logs, undercut banks, and overhanging vegetation. Structure provides protection from predators, bright sunlight, and higher water temperatures. Access to deep water for protection in winter freezes, or fast water for protection from low oxygen levels in summer are also ideal. Trout are more often found in heavy and strong currents.

Characteristics 

Defining characteristics include a slender, reddish-brown body with a long, narrow head. 

The spawning behaviour of brown trout is similar to that of the closely related Atlantic salmon. A typical female produces about 2,000 eggs per kg (900 eggs per lb) of body weight at spawning.
On September 11, 2009, a 41.45-lb (18.80-kg) brown trout was caught by Tom Healy in the Manistee River system in Michigan, setting a new state record. As of late December 2009, the fish captured by Healy was confirmed by both the International Game Fish Association and the Fresh Water Fishing Hall of Fame as the new all-tackle world record for the species. This fish now supplants the former world record from the Little Red River in Arkansas.

Brown trout can live 20 years, but as with the Atlantic salmon, a high proportion of males die after spawning, and probably fewer than 20% of anadromous female kelts recover from spawning . The migratory forms grow to significantly larger sizes for their age due to abundant forage fish in the waters where they spend most of their lives. Sea trout are more commonly female in less nutrient-rich rivers. Brown trout are active both by day and by night and are opportunistic feeders. While in freshwater, their diets frequently include invertebrates from the streambed, other fish, frogs, mice, birds, and insects flying near the water's surface. The high dietary reliance upon insect larvae, pupae, nymphs, and adults allows trout to be a favoured target for fly fishing. Sea trout are fished for especially at night using wet flies. Brown trout can be caught with lures such as spoons, spinners, jigs, plugs, plastic worm imitations, and live or dead baitfish.
Freshwater brown trout range in colour from largely silver with relatively few spots and a white belly, to the more well-known brassy brown cast fading to creamy white on the fish's belly, with medium-sized spots surrounded by lighter halos. The more silver forms can be mistaken for rainbow trout. Regional variants include the so-called "Loch Leven" trout, distinguished by larger fins, a slimmer body, and heavy black spotting, but lacking red spots. The continental European strain features a lighter golden cast with some red spotting and fewer dark spots. Notably, both strains can show considerable individual variation from this general description. Early stocking efforts in the United States used fish taken from Scotland and Germany.

Brown trout rarely form hybrids with other species; if they do, they are almost invariably infertile. One such example is the tiger trout, a hybrid with the brook trout.

Diet 
Field studies have demonstrated that brown trout fed on several animal prey species, aquatic invertebrates being the most abundant prey items. However, brown trout also feed on other taxa such as terrestrial invertebrates (e.g. Hymenoptera) or other fish. Moreover, in brown trout, as in many other fish species, a change in the diet composition normally occurs during the life of the fish, and piscivorous behaviour is most frequent in large brown trout. These shifts in the diet during fish lifecycle transitions may be accompanied by a marked reduction in intraspecific competition in the fish population, facilitating the partitioning of resources.

First feeding of newly emerged fry is very important for brown trout survival in this phase of the lifecycle, and first feeding can occur even prior to emergence. Fry start to feed before complete yolk absorption and the diet composition of newly emerged brown trout is composed of small prey such as chironomid larvae or baetid nymphs.

Stocking, farming and non-native brown trout 

The species has been widely introduced for sport fishing into North America, South America, Australia, New Zealand, and many other countries, including Bhutan, where they are the focus of a specialised fly fishery. First planting in the United States occurred April 11, 1884, into the Baldwin River, one mile east of Baldwin, Michigan. Brown trout have had serious negative impacts on upland native fish species in some of the countries where they have been introduced, particularly Australia. Because of the trout's importance as a food and game fish, it has been artificially propagated and stocked in many places in its range, and fully natural populations (uncontaminated by allopatric genomes) probably exist only in isolated places, for example in Corsica or in high alpine valleys on the European mainland.

Farming of brown trout has included the production of infertile triploid fish by increasing the water temperature just after fertilisation of eggs, or more reliably, by a process known as pressure shocking. Triploids are favoured by anglers because they grow faster and larger than diploid trout. Proponents of stocking triploids argue, because they are infertile, they can be introduced into an environment that contains wild brown trout without the negative effects of cross-breeding. However, stocking triploids may damage wild stocks in other ways. Triploids certainly compete with diploid fish for food, space, and other resources. They could also be more aggressive than diploid fish and they may disturb spawning behaviour.

Angling 

The brown trout has been a popular game fish of European anglers for centuries. It was first mentioned in angling literature as "fish with speckled skins" by Roman author Aelian (circa 200 AD) in On the Nature of Animals. This work is credited with describing the first instance of fly fishing for trout, the trout being the brown trout found in Macedonia. The Treatyse of Fysshynge with an Angle (1496) by Dame Juliana Berners, O.S.B is considered a foundational work in the history of recreational fishing, especially fly fishing. One of the most prominent fish described in the work is the brown trout of English rivers and streams:

The renowned The Compleat Angler (1653) by Izaak Walton is replete with advice on "the trout":

Throughout the 17th, 18th, and 19th centuries, angling authors, mostly British, some French, and later American, writing about trout fishing were writing about fishing for brown trout. Once brown trout were introduced into the U.S. in the 1880s, they became a major subject of American angling literature. In 1889, Frederic M. Halford, a British angler, author published Dry-Fly Fishing in Theory and Practice, a seminal work codifying a half century of evolution of fly fishing with floating flies for brown trout. In the late 19th century, American angler and writer Theodore Gordon, often called the "Father of American Dry Fly Fishing", perfected dry-fly techniques for the newly arrived, but difficult-to-catch brown trout in Catskill rivers such as the Beaverkill and Neversink Rivers. In the early 20th century, British angler and author G. E. M. Skues pioneered nymphing techniques for brown trout on English chalk streams. His Minor Tactics of the Chalk Stream (1910) began a revolution in fly fishing techniques for trout. In 1917, Scottish author Hamish Stuart published the first comprehensive text, The Book of The Sea Trout, specifically addressing angling techniques for the anadromous forms of brown trout.

Introductions of brown trout into the American West created new angling opportunities, none so successful from an angling perspective as was the introduction of browns into the upper Firehole River in Yellowstone National Park in 1890. One of the earliest accounts of trout fishing in the park is from Mary Trowbridge Townsend's 1897 article in Outing Magazine "A Woman's Trout Fishing in Yellowstone Park" in which she talks about catching the von Behr trout in the river:

Within the US, brown trout introductions have created self-sustaining fisheries throughout the country. Many are considered "world-class" such as in the Great Lakes and in several Arkansas tailwaters. Outside the U.S. and outside its native range in Europe, introduced brown trout have created "world-class" fisheries in New Zealand, Patagonia, and the Falklands.

References

Further reading 
 
 
Clover, Charles. 2004. The End of the Line: How overfishing is changing the world and what we eat. Ebury Press, London.

External links

 
 Life Cycle of the Sea Trout
 Salmo trutta Linnaeus 1758 GLANSIS Species FactSheet (Distributional information for North America)

Salmo
Freshwater fish of Europe
Fish of the United States
Fish of the Western United States
Fish of Pakistan
Fish described in 1758
Taxa named by Carl Linnaeus
Freshwater fish of North America